Mike Kernell (born December 20, 1951, in Memphis, Tennessee) is a former member of the Tennessee House of Representatives, 1975-2012. Kernell is married with two children.

Kernell, a Democrat, was first elected to the 89th Tennessee General Assembly in 1974. He lives in Memphis and represented the 93rd district (a portion of Shelby County). He was Vice Chair of the Government Operations Committee and was a member of the Conservation and Environment Committee, the Parks and Tourism and Wildlife Subcommittee.

Kernell opposed 2004 cutbacks to TennCare, which he criticized for moving the burden of paying for medical care received by the uninsured to local taxpayers.

In October 2008, Kernell's son David was indicted by a Tennessee grand jury in connection with the unauthorized access of Republican vice presidential candidate Sarah Palin's Yahoo! Mail account; he was convicted April 30, 2010 on two counts of anticipatory obstruction of justice and unauthorized access to a computer, but was acquitted on a charge of wire fraud. Mike Kernell has denied knowing anything about the incident.

Re-election 
In the November 4, 2008 elections, Mike Kernell defeated Republican candidate and former Homeland Security agent Tim Cook.

Cook was again the Republican nominee in 2010, and Kernell again defeated him, with 6,478 votes to Cook's 4,518.

Kernell's district was redrawn in 2012 by the Republican-controlled legislature, pitting him against fellow Democratic incumbent G. A. Hardaway in the August 2, 2012 Democratic primary. Kernell lost to Hardaway, ending his 38-year tenure. Hardaway won the primary with 2,927 votes (61.0%), and was unopposed in the November 6, 2012 General election, winning with 16,126 votes.

References

External links
Official legislative page
Project Vote Smart - Voting Record
To Register Doubts, Press Here - New York Times

1951 births
Democratic Party members of the Tennessee House of Representatives
Living people
Politicians from Memphis, Tennessee